The National Football Conference – Northern Division or NFC North  is one of the four divisions of the National Football Conference (NFC) in the National Football League (NFL). Nicknamed the "Black and Blue Division" for the rough and tough rivalry games between the teams, it currently has four members: the Chicago Bears, Detroit Lions, Green Bay Packers, and Minnesota Vikings, with the latter three based within most definitions of the Upper Midwest. The NFC North was previously known as the NFC Central from 1970 to 2001. The Tampa Bay Buccaneers were previously members, from 1977, one year after they joined the league as an expansion team, until 2002 when they moved to the NFC South. 
The division was created in 1967 as the Central Division of the NFL's Western Conference and existed for three seasons before the AFL–NFL merger. After the merger, it was renamed the NFC Central and retained that name until the NFL split into eight divisions in 2002. The four current division teams have been together in the same division or conference since the Vikings joined the league in 1961. The Bears, Lions (known as the Portsmouth Spartans until 1934) and Packers have been in the same division or conference since the NFL began a conference format in 1933. Largely because the four teams have played each other at least twice a year, with the exception of the strike-shortened 1982 season, for more than 60 years (more than 80 years in the case of the Bears, Lions and Packers), the entire division is considered one very large rivalry.

The division has a total of five Super Bowl wins. The Packers have won four and the Bears one, with the most recent happening at the conclusion of the 2010 season. Of the ten NFL teams with the highest winning percentage throughout their respective franchise histories, three of them are in the NFC North (the Packers, the Bears, and the Vikings). Conversely, the Lions have one of the lowest winning percentages in the NFL, including the first winless 16-game season in NFL history, in 2008. The division has the second-longest active Super Bowl drought (only ahead of the AFC South) and a 1–8 record in conference championships since 2007, with the only win being the Packers over the Bears in 2010. They have only clinched two Super Bowl berths in the 21st century, while the other NFC divisions each have six or more.

The Packers hold an overall regular season record of 763–577–38 with an overall playoff record of 35–23, four Super Bowl titles in five Super Bowl appearances, and nine pre-Super Bowl league titles.  The Bears hold an overall regular season record of 774–596–42 with an overall playoff record of 17–19, one Super Bowl title in two Super Bowl appearances, and eight pre-Super Bowl league titles.  The Vikings hold an overall regular season record of 492–409–11 with an overall playoff record of 21–30, no Super Bowl titles in four Super Bowl appearances, and one pre-Super Bowl league title. The Lions hold an overall regular season record of 566–677–33 with an overall playoff record of 7–13, and four pre-Super Bowl league titles. They have yet to appear in a Super Bowl.

The division earned the moniker "Black and Blue Division" due to its intense rivalries and physical style of play, and this nickname is still used regularly today. It is also known as the "Frostbite Division" as all teams played home games in late season winter cold until the mid-1970s. The division is also humorously called the "Frozen North", although Detroit has played its home games indoors since 1975, and Minnesota also did so from 1982 to 2013 and returned to indoor home games at U.S. Bank Stadium in 2016.

ESPN sportscaster Chris Berman often refers to this division as the "NFC Norris" because of its grittiness and its geographical similarity to the National Hockey League's former Norris Division, although in a twist of irony the NHL dropped the Norris name in favor of Central almost a decade before the NFL dropped the Central name in favor of North.

Division lineups
Place cursor over year for division champ or Super Bowl team. 
 

The NFL Western Conference was divided into the Coastal and Central divisions. The Packers had won Super Bowl I in 1966 in the NFL Western Conference.
Starting in the 1970 season, the division became the National Football Conference - Central Division (or NFC Central for short), after the AFL–NFL merger.
Tampa Bay moved from the AFC West in 1977
For the 2002 season, the league realigned to have 8 four team divisions. Division adopts current name. Tampa Bay moves to the NFC South.

Division champions

+ A players' strike in 1982 reduced the regular season to nine games, so the league used a special 16-team playoff tournament just for this year. Division standings were ignored; Green Bay had the best record of the division teams.

Wild Card qualifiers

+ A players' strike in 1982 reduced the regular season to nine games, so the league used a special 16-team playoff tournament just for this year.

Total playoff berths

Total playoff berths as members of the NFC Central/North
(1967–2021 seasons)

To sort table above, click button to right of heading.

(1)Does not include Green Bay's 1966 season Super Bowl I win

(2)Does not include Tampa Bay's 1976 season (AFC West) and 2002+ seasons (NFC South)

Total playoff berths in team history
(1920–2021 seasons)

To sort table above, click button to right of heading.
1 From 1966 to 1969, this means winning both the NFL Championship game AND the Super Bowl. Hence, the Vikings' NFL Championship victory in 1969 isn't counted. The Packers had 2 NFL titles during this time frame and also won Super Bowl I and II.

Season results

2002: The NFC Central was realigned for 4 members and was renamed the NFC North. The Tampa Bay Buccaneers moved to the newly formed NFC South.

Schedule assignments

See also
Bears–Packers rivalry
Bears–Lions rivalry
Bears–Vikings rivalry
Lions–Packers rivalry
Lions–Vikings rivalry
Packers–Vikings rivalry

References

National Football League divisions
Chicago Bears
Detroit Lions
History of the Green Bay Packers
Minnesota Vikings
Tampa Bay Buccaneers
1967 establishments in the United States
Sports in the Midwestern United States